Ronald H. Weyandt (March 7, 1935 – January 10, 2003) was a former member of the Ohio House of Representatives.

References

Ohio Democrats
1935 births
2003 deaths